Kostas Eleftherakis (born 18 July 1950) is a Greek former international football player who played as a midfielder. His nickname was "the Deer".

Club career
He started his career in 1964–65, playing for second division side Fostiras. He later joined Panathinaikos in 1968. At age 21 he played for Panathinaikos at 1971 European Cup Final in Wembley Stadium against Ajax Amsterdam. He scored 2 goals during that campaign to reach the final.

Following that game, Real Madrid and Everton expressed interest in acquiring him. Real Madrid would offer an inconceivable (for the time) 35 million drachmas for Kostas Eleftherakis. But Costas Aslanidis (Secretary General of Athletics, appointed by the Greek military junta of 1967–1974) would stand in the way.  The same happened when Everton made an offer through Billy Bingham who coached Greece in the early 1970s.

He was invited to play for the World XI.

An injury he sustained in May 1977 would force him to stay away from the game for six months. He would never regain his form completely after that. Five years later he retired from football. He ended his career playing again at Fostiras.

He played a total of 331 games in the first division, 308 of which with Panathinaikos, and scored 88 goals.

International career
Eleftherakis made 34 appearances for the Greece national football team from 1969 to 1977.

Honours

Panathinaikos
Alpha Ethniki: 1968–69, 1969–70, 1971–72, 1976–77
Greek Cup: 1968–69, 1976–77
Greater Greece Cup: 1970

References

Panathinaikos F.C. players
AEK Athens F.C. players
Fostiras F.C. players
Super League Greece players
1950 births
Greece international footballers
Living people
Association football midfielders
Footballers from Athens
Greek footballers